Pope Gregory X (1271–1276) create five cardinals in one consistory.

Consistory of 3 June 1273 
 Pedro Julião, archbishop of Braga — cardinal-bishop of Frascati, later elected Pope John XXI (20 September 1276), † 20 May 1277
 Vicedomino de Vicedominis, nephew of His Holiness and archbishop of Aix — cardinal-bishop of Palestrina, † 6 September 1276
 Bonaventure, O.F.M., Minister General of the Order of Friars Minor — cardinal-bishop of Albano, † 15 July 1274
 Pierre de Tarentaise, O.P., archbishop of Lyon — cardinal-bishop of Ostia e Velletri, then (21 January 1276) Pope Innocent V † 22 June 1276
 Bertrand de Saint-Martin, O.S.B., archbishop of Arles — cardinal-bishop of Sabina, † 28 March 1278 (?)

"Presumed cardinals"
According to Cardella in 1275 Gregory X celebrated the second consistory for the creation of two additional cardinals, but modern scholars have established that this never happened:

Apart from the lack of any documentary proof attesting the promotion of these individuals (in the case of Visconti - even of his existence), the contemporary chronicler Salimbene explicitly says that the consistory of 1273 was the only single promotion of the new cardinals in the pontificate of Gregory X, and mentions only five cardinals promoted at that time.

Notes

Sources 

 Konrad Eubel: Hierarchia Catholica Medii Aevi, vol. 1, Münster 1913
 Richard Stapper: Papst Johannes XXI, Kirchengeschichtliche Studien, Münster 1898
 Richard Sternfeld, Der Kardinal Johann Gaetan Orsini (Papst Nikolaus III.) 1244-1277, Berlin 1905 
 Lorenzo Cardella: Memorie storiche de' cardinali della Santa Romana Chiesa, vol. 2, Rome 1793

Gregory X
College of Cardinals
Gre